Jules-Descartes Férat (1829, Ham, Somme – 1906, Paris) was a French artist and illustrator, famous for his portrayals of factories and their workers.

He illustrated the books of many known authors, such as Jules Verne, Edgar Allan Poe, and Victor Hugo. Some critics consider his illustrations for Jules Verne's novel The Mysterious Island to be his greatest masterpieces. He also contributed to the French illustrated press including the newspapers L'Illustration, Le Journal Illustré, and L'Univers Illustré.

Books illustrated by Férat

Jules Verne
Novels
(1871) A Floating City, 44 illustrations
(1872) The Adventures of Three Englishmen and Three Russians in South Africa, 53 illustrations
(1873) The Fur Country, 103 illustrations (with Alfred Quesnay de Beaurépaire)
(1875) The Mysterious Island, 152 illustrations
(1876) Michael Strogoff, 91 illustrations
(1877) The Child of the Cavern, 45 illustrations
Short stories
(1871) The Blockade Runners, 17 illustrations
(1875) Martin Paz, 12 illustrations
(1876) A Drama in Mexico, 6 illustrations

External links

 The Illustrators of Jules Verne’s Voyages Extraordinaires
 

1829 births
1906 deaths
French illustrators
Jules Verne
People from Ham, Somme